Leonid Meshkov (14 January 1916 – 4 March 1986) was a Soviet swimmer. He competed in the men's 4 × 200 metre freestyle relay at the 1952 Summer Olympics.

References

1916 births
1986 deaths
Soviet male freestyle swimmers
Olympic swimmers of the Soviet Union
Swimmers at the 1952 Summer Olympics
Sportspeople from Volgograd